The local conference of bishops is the Episcopal Conference of Mali (French: Episcopal Conférence du Mali, EMC), established in 1970.

The CEM is a member of the Regional Episcopal Conference of Francophone West Africa and Symposium of Episcopal Conferences of Africa and Madagascar (SECAM).

List of presidents of the Bishops' Conference:

1970-1987: Luc Sangaré Auguste, Archbishop of Bamako

1987-1996: Jean-Baptiste Marie Cisse, Bishop of Sikasso

1996-2009: Jean-Gabriel Diarra, Bishop of San

2009 by Jean-Baptiste Tiama, Bishop of Sikasso

See also
Catholic Church in Mali

References

External links
 http://eglisemali.org/
 http://www.gcatholic.org/dioceses/country/ML.htm
 http://www.catholic-hierarchy.org/country/ml.html 

Christian organizations established in 1970
Mali
Catholic Church in Mali

it:Chiesa cattolica in Mali#Conferenza_episcopale